Ormesson is the name or part of the name of two communes of France:
Ormesson in the Seine-et-Marne département
Ormesson-sur-Marne in the Val-de-Marne département

See also
Jean d'Ormesson (1925-2017), French writer
Wladimir d'Ormesson (1888-1973), French writer and diplomat, uncle of Jean